NOFX is an EP by the American punk rock band NOFX, released August 2, 2011, through Fat Wreck Chords and consisting almost entirely of cover versions of hardcore punk songs. The idea for the EP was originally announced in 2009—before the release of the group's eleventh studio album Coaster—and was originally announced to be released exclusively as a 10" vinyl record. The EP was also made available in 7", 12", and picture disc formats, all containing the same track listing.

Track listing
The EP features eight cover versions of songs that were originally written by "rather obscure American hardcore bands" from the 1980s. The album's packaging does not list any song titles or writing credits. In various interviews, NOFX frontman Fat Mike suggested that the album would include songs by Necros, Social Unrest, Stretch Marks, and Rebel Truth. One of the songs is an original NOFX composition.

1 - Friend Or Foe (Agnostic Front cover) - 1:07 
2 - IQ32 (Necros cover) - 0:24 
3 - Police Brutality (Urban Waste cover) - 0:49 
4 - Mental Breakdown (Social Unrest cover) - 1:26
5 - No More Lies (Battalion Of Saints cover) - 1:19 
6 - Race Riot (NOFX) - 0:50 
7 - Say We Suck (Sin 34 cover) -  1:11 
8 - Child Hosts The Parasite (Rebel Truth cover) - 1:06 
9 - Professional Punk (Stretch Marks cover) - 1:39

Personnel
NOFX
 Fat Mike – vocals (5 - 7, 9), bass 
 Eric Melvin – guitar, vocals (all songs)
 El Hefe – guitar, vocals (6)
 Erik Sandin – drums

References

NOFX EPs
2011 EPs
Fat Wreck Chords EPs